Veppanthattai is a taluk of Perambalur district of the Indian state of Tamil Nadu. The headquarters of the taluk is the town of Veppanthattai.

Demographics
According to the 2011 census, the taluk of Veppanthattai had a population of 148,700 with 73,598 males and 75,102 females. There were 1020 women for every 1000 men. The taluk had a literacy rate of 65.36. Child population in the age group below 6 was 7,906 Males and 7,266 Females.

References

Taluks of Perambalur district